Maurice Droessart was a Luxembourgian footballer who played as a goalkeeper and made one appearance for the Luxembourg national team.

Career
Droessart played for the club Red Boys Differdange in the 1920s. He was included in Luxembourg's football squad for the 1924 Summer Olympics held in Paris. However, he did not appear in the tournament, as Étienne Bausch started in the team's first match in which they were eliminated by Italy. Droessart later earned his first and only cap for Luxembourg on 13 February 1927 in a friendly match against France B. The away match, which took place in Lyon, finished as a 2–5 loss.

Career statistics

International

References

Date of birth missing
Date of death missing
Luxembourgian footballers
Luxembourg international footballers
Olympic footballers of Luxembourg
Footballers at the 1924 Summer Olympics
Association football goalkeepers
FA Red Boys Differdange players
Luxembourg National Division players